Lucas Marcolini Dantas Bertucci, known simply as Lucas (born 6 May 1989) is a Brazilian midfielder player who plays for Hungarian club Kisvárda.

Club career
He made his professional debut for Debrecen in the 2008–09 UEFA Cup against Young Boys Bern.

On 3 January 2022, Lucas joined Diósgyőr on loan.

Club statistics

Updated to games played as of 15 May 2021.

References

External links
Profile

1989 births
People from Cornélio Procópio
Sportspeople from Paraná (state)
Living people
Brazilian footballers
Association football midfielders
Debreceni VSC players
Békéscsaba 1912 Előre footballers
FK Bodva Moldava nad Bodvou players
Kisvárda FC players
Diósgyőri VTK players
Nemzeti Bajnokság I players
Nemzeti Bajnokság II players
2. Liga (Slovakia) players
Brazilian expatriate footballers
Expatriate footballers in Hungary
Brazilian expatriate sportspeople in Hungary
Expatriate footballers in Slovakia
Brazilian expatriate sportspeople in Slovakia